Ceduna Waters is a locality in the Australian state of South Australia located on the west coast of the Eyre Peninsula overlooking two bays associated with Great Australian Bight about  north-west of the state capital of Adelaide and about  south-east of the town centre of Ceduna.

The boundaries of the locality were created in 2011 by the exclusion of a portion of land from the locality of Ceduna.  The locality’s naming is reported as reflecting “the location and the new subdivision's marine focus.”

Ceduna Waters consists of land associated with a section of coastline that includes, from west to east, part of the east coast of Bosanquet Bay, the promontory known as Cape Vivonne and part of the west coast of Decres Bay.  As of 2012, the majority land use within the locality was residential with the coastline being zoned for conservation purposes.

Ceduna Waters is located within the federal Division of Grey, the state electoral district of Flinders and the local government area of the District Council of Ceduna.

References

External links
Ceduna Online

Towns in South Australia
Eyre Peninsula